The name Linda has been used for eleven tropical cyclones worldwide.

In the Eastern Pacific:

Tropical Storm Linda (1985) – Minimal tropical storm that crossed into the Central Pacific as a tropical depression.
Hurricane Linda (1991) – Category 3 hurricane which recurved out to sea.
Hurricane Linda (1997) – Category 5 hurricane that became the second-most intense hurricane in the Eastern Pacific basin with a minimum pressure of 902 mbar. Also the second strongest hurricane in the Pacific in terms of 1-min sustained winds.
Hurricane Linda (2003) – Category 1 hurricane that never affected land.
Hurricane Linda (2009) – Category 1 hurricane that caused no damages or deaths.
Hurricane Linda (2015) – Category 3 hurricane which affected Baja California, bringing heavy rainfall and deadly flash flooding to Utah.
Hurricane Linda (2021) – Long-lived Category 4 hurricane that stayed out at sea.

In the Australian region:
Tropical Cyclone Linda (1976), made landfall south of Darwin, Australia.
Tropical Cyclone Linda (2004), persisted out to sea.
Tropical Cyclone Linda (2018), never affected land. 

In the Western Pacific:
Tropical Storm Linda (1997) – Catastrophic system which killed over 3123 people in various parts of Southeast Asia. Considered the worst storm in southern Vietnam is over a century. Also called Openg in the Philippines, and BOB 08 in the North Indian Ocean.

Pacific hurricane set index articles
Pacific typhoon set index articles
Australian region cyclone set index articles